This is a list of notable academics related to the University of Birmingham and its predecessors, Mason Science College and Queen's College, Birmingham. This page includes those who work or have worked as lecturers, readers, professors, fellows, and researchers at Birmingham University. Administrators are included only in exceptional cases. Those who are/were academics of the university as well as alumni are included on the list of University of Birmingham alumni.

Nobel Prize recipients
Sir Paul Nurse 2001 Nobel Prize in Physiology President of the Royal Society

Science, engineering and medicine

Biology
 Rupert E. Billingham, former Chair in Zoology
 Jack Cohen,  a reproductive biologist also known for his science books and involvement with science fiction.
 Steve Busby, Professor of Biochemistry 
 John Berry Haycraft, professor in Physiology at Mason Science College, discovered an anticoagulant created by the leech, which he named hirudin
 Lancelot Hogben, Professor of Zoology (1941–1947) and Professor of Medical Statistics (1947–1961)
 Sir Kenneth Mather, Professor of Genetics (1948), recipient of the 1964 Darwin Medal, later Vice Chancellor of the University of Southampton
 Laura Piddock, Professor of Microbiology, specialising in resistance to antibiotics
 Bryan M. Turner, Professor of Experimental Genetics
 Horace Waring, zoologist, head of the department of zoology (1946–1948) and recipient of the 1962 Clarke Medal of the Royal Society of New South Wales
 Richard Henry Yapp, botanist
 William Brunsdon Yapp, zoologist and author
 Solly Zuckerman, Baron Zuckerman, Professor of Anatomy (1946–1968) and chief scientific adviser to the British government (1964-1971)

Chemistry
 Leroy (Lee) Cronin, chemist, Regius Chair of Chemistry at the University of Glasgow
 Percy F. Frankland, chemist
 Sir Fraser Stoddart, chemist, researcher in supramolecular chemistry and nanotechnology, Professor of Chemistry (1990–1997)
 Sir William A. Tilden, Professor of Chemistry (1880–1894)
 Thomas Summers West, analytical chemist (1949–1963)

Engineering and computing
 Norman Percy Allen, metallurgist (1929–1933)
 Adrian John Brown, Professor of Malting and Brewing (1900–1928)
 Lord Cadman, mining engineer and petroleum technologist
 John Knott, Professor of Metallurgy and Materials, recipient of the 2005 Leverhulme Medal
 Sir Richard Redmayne, professor of mining 1902-08, first Chief Inspector of Mines
 Aaron Sloman, former Chair in Artificial Intelligence and Cognitive Science
 Thomas Turner, metallurgist
 Arnold Tustin, Professor of Engineering (1947–1955)

Geology
 Charles Lapworth, the first Professor of Geology at Mason Science College
 Sir Raymond Priestley, geologist, early Antarctic explorer, and Vice-Chancellor of the University of Birmingham
 Frederick William Shotton, geologist whose research into the geological makeup of Normandy beaches helped allied commanders decide which were the best to use on D-Day
 William Whitehead Watts, geologist
 Sir Alwyn Williams, geologist, Professor of Geology (1974–1976)

Mathematics and statistics
 Jonathan Bennett, Professor of Mathematics, recipient of the 2011 Whitehead Prize of the London Mathematical Society 
 Nora Calderwood, Scottish mathematician and namesake of the Universities Calderwood Prize in mathematics 
 Henry Daniels, statistician, the first professor of mathematical statistics (1957–1978), recipient of the Guy Medal in Gold in 1984
 Micaiah John Muller Hill, English mathematician, known for Hill's spherical vortex and Hill's tetrahedra
 Daniela Kühn, Mason Professor of Mathematics, recipient of the 2003 European Prize in Combinatorics and the 2014 Whitehead Prize of the London Mathematical Society
 Deryk Osthus, Professor in Graph Theory, recipient of the 2003 European Prize in Combinatorics and the 2014 Whitehead Prize of the London Mathematical Society
 Bill Parry, mathematician, lectureship at the university (1960–1965)
 Daniel Pedoe, mathematician, Professor of Mathematics (1942–1946)
 G. N. Watson, Professor of Mathematics from 1918 to 1951, recipient of the 1946 Sylvester Medal

Medicine
 Wiebke Arlt, current William Withering Chair in Medicine
 Sir Melville Arnott, former William Withering Chair in Medicine
 George Augustus Auden, former School Medical Officer and Lecturer in Public Health
 Ian Brockington, British psychiatrist
 Wilfrid Butt, former Honorary Professor of Endocrinology
 William Sands Cox, surgeon and the founder of Queen's College, Birmingham
 Lord Ilkeston, physician
 Douglas Vernon Hubble, former chair in paediatrics and dean of the Faculty of Medicine
 Dierdre Kelly, Irish clinician
 Ian Calman Muir MacLennan, Professor of Immunology
 Dion Morton, Professor of Surgery
 Geoffrey Slaney, Barling Chair of Surgery 
 Kenneth Walton, experimental pathologist and rheumatologist, former Professor of Experimental Pathology
 Sir Bertram Windle, Dean of the Medical School
 John H. Coote, Bowman Professor of Physiology (1983-2004)

Physics
David Charlton, Professor of Particle Physics, ATLAS Spokesman, CERN (2013-2017), recipient of the 2017 Richard Glazebrook Medal
John Dowell, FRS, Nuclear physicist, Professor of Elementary Particle Physics (1980–2002)
Freeman Dyson, physicist, teaching fellow (1949–1951)
Yvonne Elsworth, Professor of Helioseismology and Poynting Professor of Physics, recipient of the 2011 Payne-Gaposchkin Prize
 Klaus Fuchs, theoretical physicist and atomic spy
 Sir Leonard Huxley, physicist
 J. Michael Kosterlitz, Research Fellow in high energy physics, 1970-1973; lecturer, 1974-1982; recipient of the 2000 Lars Onsager Prize
 Philip Burton Moon, former Professor of Physics, recipient of the 1991 Hughes Medal
 Sir Marcus Oliphant, Poynting Professor of Physics (1937–1950)
 Sir Rudolf Peierls, Professor of Mathematical Physics (1937–1943; 1945–1963), recipient of the 1986 Copley Medal
 John Henry Poynting, former Professor of Physics, recipient of the 1893 Adams Prize and the 1905 Royal Medal
 Sir John Randall, Royal Society fellow (1937–1943), worked on the cavity magnetron valve, recipient of the 1946 Hughes Medal
 James Sayers, physicist who played a crucial role in developing centimetric radar
 Tony Skyrme, former research fellow, recipient of the 1985 Hughes Medal
 David J. Thouless, Professor of Mathematical Physics from 1965 to 1978, recipient of the 2000 Lars Onsager Prize
 William Frank Vinen, Professor of Physics, recipient of the 1980 Rumford Medal

Humanities, management and social sciences

 U.R. Ananthamurthy, academic and writer
 Edward Arber, academic and writer
 Sir William James Ashley, first Dean and the founder of the Birmingham Business School
 Sir Granville Bantock, Peyton Professor of Music, conductor and composer, co-founded City of Birmingham Orchestra 1920
 Karin Barber, Professor of African Cultural Anthropology and former Director of the Centre of West African Studies
 Andrew Barker, Professor of Classics
 Sir Charles Raymond Beazley, Professor of History
 Mark Beeson, former Head of the Department of Political Science and International Studies
 Sir Nathan Bodington, Professor of classics
 Lord Borrie, English lawyer, Labour Party life peer, law professor at Birmingham University 
 Stewart Brown, Reader in African Literature and Director of the Centre of West African Studies
 Anthony Burgess, British novelist who taught in the extramural department (1946–50)
 Peter Burnham, Professor of Political Science and International Studies
 Winifred Cavenagh, Professor of Social Administration and Criminology 
 John Churton Collins, former Professor of English Literature
 Reginald Cline-Cole, Senior Lecturer at the Centre of West African Studies
 Thomas Diez, Professor of International Relations Theory
 E. R. Dodds, Professor of Greek (1924–1936)
 Sir Michael Dummett, philosopher
 David Edgar, Professor of Playwrighting Studies
 Sir Edward Elgar, Professor of Music, composer
 John Fage, former Professor of African History, founder of Birmingham's Centre for West African Studies
 Hermann Georg Fiedler, German scholar
 David F. Ford, lecturer and senior lecturer of theology, 1976–1991
 Frank Hahn, lecturer in economics 1948-1960
 Stuart Hall, former Director of the Centre for Contemporary Cultural Studies
 Sir Keith Hancock, Australian historian
 William Haywood, Special Lecturer in Town Planning, architect and founder of the Birmingham Civic Society
 John Hick, emeritus H.G. Wood Professor of Theology
 Rodney Hilton,  former Professor of Medieval History
 Richard Hoggart, founder of the Centre for Contemporary Cultural Studies and former Assistant Director-General of UNESCO
 A. G. Hopkins, historian
 Bill Hopkins, taught music at the University
 Susan Hunston, Professor in the Department of English Language and Applied Linguistics
 Mervyn King, Baron King of Lothbury, former professor in the Faculty of Commerce and Governor of the Bank of England
 Carenza Lewis, archaeologist
 Jeannette Littlemore, Professor in the Department of English Language and Applied Linguistics
 Jerzy Lukowski, Historian
 Sir Michael Lyons, Professor of Public Policy from 2001 to 2006
 Louis MacNeice, poet and playwright, lecturer in classics (1930–1936) 
 Anand Menon, Professor of West European Politics and Director of the European Research Institute
 John Henry Muirhead, philosopher
 Allardyce Nicoll, Head of the English Department and founding director of the Shakespeare Institute
 Ronen Palan, Professor of International Political Economy
 Maureen Perrie, Professor Emeritus in Russian History
 Sir Nikolaus Pevsner, art historian who held a research post at the university for a number of years
 Owen Hood Phillips, Barber Professor of Jurisprudence, Dean of the Faculty of Law, Vice-Principal and Pro-Vice-Chancellor
 Philip Rahtz, British archaeologist
 Brinley Rees, lecturer in Classics (1970–1975)
 Sir Francis Richards, Director, Centre for Studies in Security and Diplomacy, former de facto Head of State of Gibraltar
Nicola Rollock, Social Scientist and Race Equality Activist
 Alan S. C. Ross, Professor of English Language (1948–1951) and Professor of Linguistics (1951–1974)
 Ernest de Sélincourt, literary scholar and critic
 John McHardy Sinclair, Professor of Modern English Language, founder of the COBUILD project
 Ninian Smart, former Professor of Religious Studies
 Edward Adolf Sonnenschein, classical scholar and writer on Latin grammar and verse
 Colin Thain, Professor of Political Science
 Sir Alan Walters, Professor of Econometrics and Statistics (1951–1968) and Chief Economic Adviser to the former British Prime Minister Margaret Thatcher
 Sir Ellis Waterhouse, Barber Professor of Fine Art (1952–1970)
 Stanley Wells, Emeritus Professor of Shakespeare Studies and former Director of the Shakespeare Institute
 Tony Wright, lecturer in politics, 1975-1992, before being elected Labour Member of Parliament for Cannock and Burntwood
 Gordon Warwick, Reader in Geomorphology
 David Yardley, Barber Professor of Law (1974–1978)
 Ken Young, Professor and Director of the Institute of Local Government Studies (1987–1990)

See also
 List of University of Birmingham people
 List of University of Birmingham alumni

References

University of Birmingham
Birmingham
Academics of the University of Birmingham